SCCC or sccc may refer to:

Scandinavia Chinese Christian Church, a collaboration of Chinese churches/congregations in Scandinavia.
Scottish Consultative Council on the Curriculum, see Learning and Teaching Scotland
South Carolina Corps of Cadets, the student body at The Citadel in Charleston, SC, USA
Southern Cross Catholic College, a catholic secondary school in Brisbane, Australia
Spring Creek Correctional Center, a maximum security prison in Seward, Alaska
Students for Concealed Carry on Campus, a collegiate pro-gun rights organization in the USA
Sentul City Convention Center, now the Sentul International Convention Center, West Java, Indonesia
Sacramento Chinese Catholic Community, California, USA

Cricket clubs
Somerset County Cricket Club, England
St Columba's Cricket Club, Rhode Island, USA
Surrey County Cricket Club, England
Sussex County Cricket Club, England

Community colleges in the United States

St. Charles Community College, St. Charles, Missouri
Schenectady County Community College, Schenectady, New York.
Seattle Central Community College, Seattle, Washington
Seward County Community College, Liberal, Kansas
Suffolk County Community College, Suffolk County, New York.
Sullivan County Community College, Sullivan County, New York.
Sussex County Community College, Sussex County, New Jersey.